Gao Lei (born 3 January 1992) is a Chinese individual trampoline gymnast, Olympian, and four-time world champion. He won the bronze medal at the 2016 Summer Olympics. Gao won the gold medal at the 2015 Trampoline World Championships in the individual event. At the 2017 and 2018 Trampoline Gymnastics World Championships, he won both individual and team gold medals. At the 2019 Trampoline Gymnastics World Championships, he won the gold medal in the individual event, marking his fourth World Championship win.

References

External links
 
 
 

1992 births
Living people
Chinese male trampolinists
Place of birth missing (living people)
Olympic gymnasts of China
Olympic medalists in gymnastics
2016 Olympic bronze medalists for China
Gymnasts at the 2016 Summer Olympics
Medalists at the Trampoline Gymnastics World Championships
Asian Games medalists in gymnastics
Asian Games silver medalists for China
Medalists at the 2018 Asian Games
Gymnasts at the 2018 Asian Games
Gymnasts from Shanghai
Gymnasts at the 2020 Summer Olympics
21st-century Chinese people